David James Waller (born 9 November 1958) is a British Anglican priest who has been Archdeacon of Gibraltar and of Italy and Malta, in the Diocese in Europe since 14 January 2020.

Waller was educated at Whitelands College, Ripon College Cuddeson and ordained in 1988. He also attended Roehampton Institute (BA, 1985), King's College London (MA, 1995), Heythrop College, University of London (MTh ,2002) and Sarum College (MA, 2016). After a curacy at Tettenhall Regis he was Chaplain at the University of Greenwich from 1992 to 1997. He was Priest in charge at St Matthew, Yiewsley from 1997 to 2001; and Team Rector of Plymstock from 2001 to 2012. He was Chaplain at St Philip and St James, Palma de Mallorca  from 2012 to 2019.

References

1958 births
Living people
Alumni of the University of Roehampton
Alumni of King's College London
Alumni of Heythrop College
Gibraltarian religious leaders
Archdeacons of Gibraltar
Archdeacons of Italy and Malta
20th-century Anglican priests
21st-century Anglican priests
People associated with the University of Greenwich